Ferhat Pasha Mosque, also known as Ferhadija Mosque, may refer to:

Bosnia and Herzegovina 
Ferhat Pasha Mosque (Banja Luka)
Ferhat Pasha Mosque (Sarajevo)

See also